Mick Kubarkku was regarded as a prominent Aboriginal Australian artist most associated with Kuninjku modernism.

Biography 
Mick Kubarkku was born near the Mann and Liverpool River Districts about 50 kilometers south of Maningrida in c. 1922. He grew up in the absence of European influence in the rock-shelters in the Mann River District.   His secluded upbringing led him to be one of the few remaining people to have recollections of painting methods for traditional rock art paintings done by elder clan members. Mick Kubarkku died May 16, 2008.

Career 
At the age of 15 Kubarkku was taught the cultural significance and crafting techniques for sacred clan designs by his father. The ease in which he picked up these techniques were noticed by the elder clan members and he was allowed to participate in painting rarrk for the Madayin ceremony. Despite his early exposure to painting, he did not continue as a full-time painter until 1957, when he settled in the newly-established government settlement of Maningrida. His early paintings used a dotted infill technique that was reminiscent of the rock art he was accustomed to seeing in his youth.  The homeland movement is regarded as the third period of Kuninjki modernism and is marked by the move from traditional rock art elements to the use of sacred designs in the artwork.  Kubarkku was one of the first prominent artists to partake in the homeland movement during the 1970s. This movement can be seen in his work as his style transitioned from rock art influence to the inclusion of more sacred elements such as the cross hatching motif often used in the Mardayin ceremony.  Other prominent motifs in his work include abstracted rarrk, Mimi spirits, and totemic animals such as the turtle, kangaroo, and echidna. Outside of painting, Kubarkku did wood carvings which usually depicted  Mimi and Yawk Yawk.

Collections 
 National Gallery of Australia 
 Artbank, Sydney 
 Art Gallery of South Australia, Adelaide 
 Art Gallery of Western Australia, Perth 
 Australian Museum, Sydney 
 Department of Archaeology and Anthropology, Australian National University, Canberra 
 Djomi Museum, Maningrida 
 Museum and Art Gallery of the Northern Territory, Darwin 
 Museum of Contemporary Art, Arnotts Collection, Sydney 
 National Gallery of Australia, Canberra 
 National Gallery of Victoria, Melbourne 
 National Maritime Museum, Darling Harbour, Sydney 
 National Museum of Australia, Canberra 
 South Australian Museum, Adelaide 
 The Holmes a Court Collection, Perth 
 The Kelton Foundation, Santa Monica, U.S.A

Significant exhibitions 
 1996 Hogarth Galleries, Sydney NSW
 1982, Aboriginal Art at the Top, Museum and Art Gallery of the Northern Territory, Darwin
 1983, Artists of Arnhem Land, Canberra School of Arts
 1987, A selection of Aboriginal Art owned by the ANU, Drill Hall Gallery, ACT
 1988, Dreamings, the art of Aboriginal Australia, The Asia Society Galleries, New York.
 1988, The Fifth National Aboriginal Art Award Exhibition, Museum and Art Gallery of the Northern Territory, Darwin
 1988, Aboriginal art of the Top End, c.1935-Early 1970s, National Gallery of Victoria, Melbourne
 1989, A selection of Aboriginal Art owned by the ANU, Drill Hall Gallery, ACT
 1989, A Myriad of Dreaming: Twentieth Century Aboriginal Art, Westpac Gallery, Melbourne; Design Warehouse Sydney
 1990, Spirit in Land, Bark Paintings from Arnhem Land, National Gallery of Victoria
 1993, The Tenth National Aboriginal Art Award Exhibition, Museum and Art Gallery of the Northern Territory, Darwin
 1993/4, ARATJARA, Art of the First Australians, Touring: Kunstammlung Nordrhein-Westfalen, Dusseldorf; Hayward Gallery, London; Louisiana Museum, Humlebaek, Denmark
 1994, Power of the Land, Masterpieces of Aboriginal Art, National Gallery of Victoria.
 1995, Moon, Rainbow and Sugarbag - The Art of Mick Kubarkku and Bardayal Nadjamerrek, Museum and Art Gallery of the Northern Territory, Darwin, and touring.
 1995, Willy Jolpa and Mick Kubarkku, Group exhibition at Aboriginal and South Pacific Gallery, Sydney.
 1995, The Twelfth National Aboriginal Art Award, Museum and Art Gallery of the Northern Territory, Darwin

Further reading 
 Crossing Country. Ian Mclean
 'They May Say Tourist, May Say Truly Painting': Aesthetic Evaluation and Meaning of Bark Paintings in Western Arnhem Land, Northern Australia. Luke Taylor
 Rainbow Sugarbag and Moon, Two Artists of the Stone Country: Bardayal Nadjamerrek and Mick Kubarkku. Margie West

References 

Australian Aboriginal artists
1920s births
2008 deaths